Samuel John Salt (30 December 1938 – 18 May 1999) was an English footballer who played as a left half.

Career
Salt began his career at Blackpool, signing his first professional contract with the club in January 1956, after playing for their youth teams. On 10 September 1960, Salt made his Blackpool debut, starting in a 1–0 loss against Bolton Wanderers. Salt would go on to make 17 further league appearances in the 1960–61 Football League First Division as Blackpool finished 20th, narrowly avoiding relegation.

In the summer of 1961, Salt dropped into non-league football, signing for Southern League side Cambridge City. The following season, Salt signed for Southern League rivals Chelmsford City. In 1965, Salt signed for Wellington Town.

References

1938 births
1999 deaths
Association football midfielders
English footballers
Footballers from Southport
Blackpool F.C. players
Cambridge City F.C. players
Chelmsford City F.C. players
Telford United F.C. players
English Football League players
Southern Football League players